Sauvik Das  (born 23 December 1983) is an Indian cricket player who played for  Assam in the Ranji Trophy. He is right-hand batsman and right-arm medium bowler. Das has played seven Ranji Trophy matches for Assam.
Das has completed NCA Level 'B' coach training.

References

External links
 

Living people
1983 births
Indian cricketers
Assam cricketers
Cricketers from Assam